Khangar is a stratovolcano located in the central part of Kamchatka Peninsula, Russia. It is the southernmost volcano of the Sredinny Range. Its 2 km-wide caldera is now filled by a lake.

See also
 List of volcanoes in Russia

References 

 

Mountains of the Kamchatka Peninsula
Volcanoes of the Kamchatka Peninsula
Stratovolcanoes of Russia
Volcanic crater lakes
VEI-6 volcanoes
Calderas of Russia
Holocene calderas
Holocene stratovolcanoes